Anne Kathryn Schleper (born January 30, 1990) is an American women's ice hockey player for the Buffalo Beauts of the National Women's Hockey League. She played college hockey for the Minnesota Golden Gophers women's ice hockey program and made her debut for the United States women's national ice hockey team at the 2011 IIHF Women's World Championship. She was born in St. Cloud, Minnesota.

Playing career
From April 4 to 12, 2011, she was one of 30 players that took part in a selection / training camp. She was named to the final roster that participated at the 2011 IIHF Women's World Championship.

Awards and honors
 WCHA co-Offensive Players of the Week (Week of October 27, 2010)
 2010–11 WCHA First Team
 2010–11 WCHA All-Academic Team
 2011 Big Ten Outstanding Sportsmanship Award
 2012 Big Ten Medal of Honor

Personal life
Schleper is a Christian. Schleper has spoken about her faith saying, "Any time you get in the athletic environment, it’s challenging as a Christian. It’s easy to have an ‘it’s about me’ attitude. That's why it's important to be around other Christians who can lift you up and pray for you. It's good to stay connected, and that's where I’ve seen those Bible studies at camps be so huge. God is opening the eyes of teammates who I would never have thought would come. He's building it into something bigger and better."

On January 27, 2017, Schleper married MLB outfielder Denard Span. They welcomed their first child, son DJ, in October 2017.

References

1990 births
American women's ice hockey defensemen
Buffalo Beauts players
Ice hockey players from Minnesota
Ice hockey players at the 2014 Winter Olympics
Living people
Medalists at the 2014 Winter Olympics
Minnesota Golden Gophers women's ice hockey players
Olympic silver medalists for the United States in ice hockey
Sportspeople from St. Cloud, Minnesota